Abdul Rashid Qambrani (born 1975) is a retired male boxer from Pakistan, who competed for his native country at the 1996 Summer Olympics in Atlanta, Georgia. There he was stopped in the first round of the men's light flyweight division (– 48 kg) by Ukraine's eventual bronze medalist Oleg Kiryukhin.

References
 sports-reference

1975 births
Living people
Light-flyweight boxers
Boxers at the 1996 Summer Olympics
Olympic boxers of Pakistan
Sindhi people
Boxers at the 1994 Asian Games
Pakistani male boxers
Asian Games competitors for Pakistan
20th-century Pakistani people